João Henriques may refer to:
João Henriques (captain-major), Portuguese captain-major of Ceylon in the 1500s
João Henriques (football manager) (born 1972), Portuguese football manager